Jefferson Lines (JL or JLI) is a regional intercity bus company operating in the United States. Their operations serve 14 states in the Midwest and West.

Background
The company is operated by Jefferson Partners L.P., located in Minneapolis, Minnesota. Jefferson Partners also conducts charter bus service within Minneapolis and Billings for large group travel. The company is the second-largest bus company in the U.S. that operates from fixed stations. Jefferson was founded in 1919 during the early days of motorcoach travel. The company's name originates from the Jefferson Highway, a north–south route in the early National Auto Trail system which once ran from Winnipeg in Manitoba, Canada, south to New Orleans, Louisiana. Jefferson expanded south of Kansas City in 1966 when it purchased Crown Coach.

By 1990, the company was believed to be the second-largest intercity bus company in the country after Continental Trailways was bought by Greyhound Lines. Jefferson went through bankruptcy in 1990 and was sold to a group led by Norwest Equity Partners. Charlie Zelle acquired a majority of Norwest's stake in 1998. Jefferson acquired the scheduled service of Jack Rabbit Lines in the Dakotas in 2000. Intercity bus lines underwent many changes in the 2000s decade after Greyhound Lines declined into bankruptcy and subsequently shed off many bus routes. Jefferson Lines has taken over operation of many former Greyhound routes and has been able to improve ridership significantly on some of them. The service to Winnipeg was cut back to Grand Forks, North Dakota, on October 7, 2010.  The company serves 13 states as of 2018:

Details
According to the company website, Jefferson Lines has 210 employees including roughly 100 drivers. Jefferson Lines is a member of the American Bus Association, United Motorcoach Association, and National Tour Association. The company is reported to have 75 buses in its fleet. Jefferson Lines was voted the best transportation company in Minnesota in 2021 in the Star Tribune's Minnesota's Best contest.

Coverage

Routes
As of September 2022, Jefferson Lines operates the following routes. Only the termini of each route are shown.

Management
Steve Woelfel became president and CEO of Jefferson Lines in January 2013 after formerly serving as CFO of Jefferson Lines for eight years. Before his career at Jefferson, Woelfel was vice president and general manager of Fox Sports Net North.

Previous to Steve was Charlie Zelle. Charlie had been an investment banker in New York City until returning to Minnesota in 1987 to take over the company from his late father, Louie. Due to poor real-estate investments, such as in the St. Anthony Main project in Minneapolis, the company was in danger of foundering, but Zelle helped restructure the company under Chapter 11 bankruptcy in 1989 and 1990.  The company was founded by Zelle's grandfather—Charlie Zelle marks the third generation of his family to work at Jefferson Lines. He owned 60% of the company as of 2010, with the remaining 40% owned by business partner Fred Kaiser of Texas. As of 2011, Charlie Zelle was also chairman of the board of the Minneapolis Regional Chamber of Commerce. In 2012, Charlie was appointed Commissioner of the Minnesota Department of Transportation. Upon beginning his new position in January 2013, Zelle withdrew as a Jefferson employee with any management authority while remaining as the Chair of the Jefferson Lines Board of Directors. He is recused from matters associated with MnDOT and Jefferson Lines relationships.

See also
 Jefferson Highway
 List of intercity bus stops in Iowa
 List of intercity bus stops in Wisconsin

References

External links
 

Intercity bus companies of the United States
Companies based in Minneapolis
Transportation companies based in Minnesota
Bus transportation in Arkansas
Bus transportation in Idaho
Bus transportation in Iowa
Bus transportation in Kansas
Bus transportation in Minnesota
Bus transportation in Missouri
Bus transportation in Montana
Bus transportation in Nebraska
Bus transportation in Oklahoma
Bus transportation in North Dakota
Bus transportation in South Dakota
Bus transportation in Washington (state)
Bus transportation in Wisconsin
Bus transportation in Wyoming